Kirkland "Kirk" Lightsey (born February 15, 1937, Detroit, Michigan) is an American jazz pianist.

Biography
Lightsey had piano instruction from the age of five and studied piano and clarinet through high school. After service in the Army, Lightsey worked in Detroit and California in the 1960s as an accompanist to singers. He also worked with jazz musicians such as Yusef Lateef, Betty Carter, Pharoah Sanders, Bobby Hutcherson, Sonny Stitt, Chet Baker, and Kenny Burrell. From 1979 to 1983 he toured with Dexter Gordon and was a member of The Leaders in the late 1980s. During the 1980s he led several sessions of his own, including duets with pianist Harold Danko. In the 1980s and since he has worked with Jimmy Raney, Clifford Jordan, Woody Shaw, David Murray, Joe Lee Wilson, Louis Stewart, Adam Taubitz, Harold Land and Gregory Porter.

He is also an accomplished flautist and occasionally doubles on flute in live performances. He has been living in Paris since 2000.

Discography

As leader
 Habiba (Gallo, 1974) with Rudolph Johnson
 Lightsey 1 (Sunnyside, 1983)
 Isotope (Criss Cross, 1983)
 Everything Happens to Me (Timeless, 1983) with Chet Baker
 Shorter by Two (Sunnyside, 1983) with Harold Danko
 Lightsey 2 (Sunnyside, 1984)
 Lightsey Live (Sunnyside, 1985)
 First Affairs (Limetree, 1986)
 Everything Is Changed (Sunnyside, 1986)
 Kirk 'n Marcus (Criss Cross, 1986) with Marcus Belgrave
 From Kirk to Nat (Criss Cross, 1990)
 Goodbye Mr. Evans (Evidence, 1994)
 The Nights of Bradley's (Sunnyside, 1984 [2004])
 Estate (Itinera, 2006)
 Everybody’s Song But Our Own (33 Records, 2008) with Louise Gibbs
 Lightsey To Gladden (Criss Cross Jazz, 2008)
 Le Corbu (Unit Records, 2015) with Tibor Elekes, Don Moye
 Some Place Called Where (Losen Records, 2017) with Marilena Paradisi
 Coltrane Revisited (SteepleChase LookOut,2021)

As sideman

With Chet Baker
 Smokin' with the Chet Baker Quintet (Prestige, 1965)
 Groovin' with the Chet Baker Quintet (Prestige, 1965)
 Comin' On with the Chet Baker Quintet (Prestige, 1965)
 Cool Burnin' with the Chet Baker Quintet (Prestige, 1965)
 Boppin' with the Chet Baker Quintet (Prestige, 1965)
With Kenny Burrell
 Sky Street (Fantasy, 1975)
With Agostino Di Giorgio
 The Path (Fonò, 2001)
With Ricky Ford
Shorter Ideas (Muse, 1984)
Looking Ahead (Muse. 1986)
Saxotic Stomp (Muse, 1987)
With Sonny Fortune
 Four in One (Blue Note, 1994)
With Clifford Jordan
 Two Tenor Winner (Criss Cross, 1984)
With Louis Hayes
The Super Quartet (Timeless, 1994)
With Blue Mitchell and Harold Land
 Mapenzi (Concord, 1977)
With David "Fathead" Newman
Heads Up (Atlantic, 1987)
Fire! Live at the Village Vanguard (Atlantic, 1989)
With David Murray
Black & Black (Red Baron, 1991)
With The Leaders
 Mudfoot (Black Hawk, 1986)
 Out Here Like This (Black Saint, 1987)
 Unforeseen Blessings (Black Saint, 1988)
 Heaven Dance (Sunnyside, 1988)
 Slipping and Sliding (Sound Hills, 1994)
With Jimmy Raney
The Master (Criss Cross, 1983)
With Rufus Reid
 Perpetual Stroll (Theresa, 1980)
With Roots
 Saying Something  (1995)
 For Bird & Diz (In+Out, 1996)
With Saheb Sarbib
 It Couldn't Happen Without You (Soul Note)
With Woody Shaw
 Imagination (Muse, 1987)
With Sonny Stitt
 Pow! (Prestige, 1965)
With Rudolph Johnson
 The Second Coming (Black Jazz Records, 1973)

References
[ Kirk Lightsey] at Allmusic

1937 births
Living people
American jazz pianists
American male pianists
Musicians from Detroit
Timeless Records artists
Criss Cross Jazz artists
Black Saint/Soul Note artists
20th-century American pianists
Jazz musicians from Michigan
21st-century American pianists
20th-century American male musicians
21st-century American male musicians
American male jazz musicians
The Leaders members
Sunnyside Records artists